Francisco Guillermo Cumplido Cereceda (23 October 1930 – 16 July 2022) was a Chilean politician who served as Minister of Justice under Patricio Aylwin's government (1990–1994).

References

External links
 Profile at Museo de la Memoria

1930 births
2022 deaths
20th-century Chilean politicians
University of Chile alumni
Instituto Nacional General José Miguel Carrera alumni
Christian Democratic Party (Chile) politicians
Chilean Ministers of Justice
Chilean lawyers
Chilean scholars of constitutional law
Politicians from Santiago